Hold Me to This: Christopher O'Riley Plays Radiohead is the second tribute album by classical pianist Christopher O'Riley of songs by the rock band Radiohead, the first being True Love Waits. Like O'Riley's earlier album, Hold Me To This surveys a broad range of Radiohead's work, producing piano arrangements of complex tracks such as "2 + 2 = 5," "Like Spinning Plates" and "Paranoid Android."

Track listing
All songs by Radiohead (Colin Greenwood, Jonny Greenwood, Ed O'Brien, Phil Selway, and Thom Yorke), arrangements by Christopher O'Riley.
 "There There" – 4:05
 "(Nice Dream)" – 3:40
 "No Surprises" – 3:26
 "Polyethylene Part 2" – 3:03
 "How I Made My Millions" – 3:22
 "Like Spinning Plates" – 3:31
 "Sail to the Moon" – 3:54
 "The Tourist" – 4:10
 "Cuttooth" – 5:11
 "2 + 2 = 5" – 3:16
 "Talk Show Host" – 7:10
 "Gagging Order" – 3:19
 "Paranoid Android" – 5:37
 "Street Spirit (Fade Out)" – 5:02

References

2005 albums
Christopher O'Riley albums
Radiohead tribute albums